The list of ship launches in 1972 includes a chronological list of all ships launched in 1972.


References

1972
Ship launches